Mysteria is a 2011 American thriller film directed by a Swiss director, Lucius C. Kuert, and starring Robert Miano, Billy Zane, Danny Glover, Meadow Williams and Martin Landau.

Synopsis
A once famous and now washed-up Hollywood screenwriter is fighting to finish his latest script with an unrealistic deadline. He finds himself in the center of a murder investigation involving a prominent politician's wife. The surrounding events feed him inspiration for his script.

Cast
 Robert Miano as Aleister
 Billy Zane as Producer
 Danny Glover as Investigator
 Meadow Williams  as Lavinia
 Martin Landau  as Hotel Manager
 Michael Rooker as Captain McCarthy
 Carlucci Weyant as Jack

References

External links
 
 

2011 thriller films
2011 films
American thriller films
2010s English-language films
2010s American films